The Bus Driver's Prayer, also known as the Busman's Lord's Prayer, is a parody of the Lord's Prayer that takes the bus driver around Greater London (while avoiding further destinations).  The words are apocryphal and have been around since 1960 at least. The word play, making extensive use of puns on English place names, is typical of English humour.  A Metropolitan police officer's version, entitled "The Law's Prayer", has also been devised.

Ian Dury's version

It was recorded by Ian Dury, originally on the soundtrack album Apples (1989) and later on The Bus Driver's Prayer & Other Stories (1992). Dury used only those place names that refer to locations in London.

Below is a version predating Dury's recording, with alternate versions given in the notes.

Our Farnham, who art in Hendon
Harrow be Thy name.
Thy Kingston come; thy Wimbledon
In Erith as it is in Hendon.
Give us this day our daily Brent
And forgive us our Westminster
As we forgive those who Westminster against us.Forgive us our Tredegars,As we forgive those who Tredegar against us
And lead us not into Thames Ditton
But deliver us from Yeovil.
For Thine is the Kingston, the Purley, and the Crawley,
For Esher and Esher.
Crouch End.

Earlier version
An earlier version, undated and possibly apocryphal, is provided by Nancy Lyon.  This undated version is linked with the development of stations on the London Underground
Our Farnham, who art in Hendon,
Holloway, Turnpike Lane
Thy Kingston come; thy Wimbledon,
On Erith as it is in Hendon.
Give us this day our Maidenhead.
And lead us not into Penge station
But deliver us from Esher.
For Thine is the Kingston, the Tower and the Horley
For Iver and Iver
Crouch End.

Also (Anon):

Our Farnham who art in Hendon/
Harrow, Turnpike Lane/
Thy Kingston Coombe/
Thy Wimbledon/
On Erith as it is in Hemel Hempstead/
Give us this day our Maidenhead/
And forgive us our Westminsters/
As we forgive those who Thames Path against us/
And lead us not into Thames Ditton/
But deliver us from Ealing/ 
For Thine is the Kingston/
The Purley and the Horley/
For Iver and Iver/
Crouch End

The Law's Prayer version 
Our sergeant, who art in Hendon, Harrow Road be thy name,
Thy Kingston Coombe, thy Wimbledon
In Erith as it is in Hendon,
Give us this day our daily Brent and forgive us our train passes
as we forgive those who Thames Path against us.
Lead us not into Thames Ditton but deliver us from Ewell
For thine is the Kingston, the Tower and the Hornsey,
For Epsom and Esher,
Amen Corner

See also
List of songs about London
Word play
Puns
Place name origins

Notes

External links
 This gives and describes the locations in Dury's version BBC The Guide to Life, The Universe and Everything
 More versions including ones based on other areas of England

Religious parodies and satires
British humour
Songs about buses
Lord's Prayer
Songs about London
English toponymy